Carburando is an Argentine media dedicated to motorsport, mainly national auto racing. It started in 1960 as a radio show and then made its way onto television and the internet. Today it belongs to Clarín Group.

Awards
 2001, 2005, 2011 and 2016 Martín Fierro Award to Best sports program.

References

Sports television in Argentina
El Trece original programming